The 1897 U.S. Open was the third U.S. Open, held September 17 at Chicago Golf Club in Wheaton, Illinois, a suburb west of Chicago. Joe Lloyd won his only major title by one stroke over runner-up Willie Anderson.

Following the first round on Friday morning, Anderson began the final round in the afternoon four clear of Lloyd, who shot a 79 over the last 18 holes to Anderson's 84 to finish a stroke ahead. Lloyd's win was capped by a three at the  finishing hole. Anderson needed a four at the last to tie Lloyd; he reached the green in three, but his putt came up  short. Anderson waited four more years for first of his record four U.S. Open titles in five years.

This was the last year that the U.S. Open and U.S. Amateur championships were played simultaneously on the same course.
It was the last time the U.S. Open was only 36 holes total, doubling to 72 holes in 1898.

Course

Past champions in the field 

Source:

Round summaries

First round
Friday, September 17, 1897 (morning)

Source:
(a) denotes amateur

Final round
Friday, September 17, 1897 (afternoon)

Source:

Amateurs: Whigham (173), Macdonald (174), Tyng (177), Douglas (180),Stewart (181), Emmet (188), Smith (189), Keene (192),Reid (194), Sweny (194), Bowers (199).

References

External links
USGA Championship Database

U.S. Open (golf)
Golf in Illinois
Wheaton, Illinois
U.S. Open (golf)
U.S. Open (golf)
U.S. Open (golf)
September 1897 sports events